Unity of Aran (Aranese: , also ) is a political party in Val d'Aran, Spain. Practically the Aranese section of Socialists' Party of Catalonia (PSC), it is the ruling party of the comarca.

Unity of Aran has its roots in Aranese nationalist  ("The Thirds", referring to Aranese traditional administrative subdivisions) founded in 1978 to safeguard a special status for the comarca in the 1979 Statute of Autonomy and the nascent UA has opposed the aspirations of Catalan nationalism and acted jointly with affiliated Aranese Nationalist Party that struggles for a separate autonomous community status. The party is chaired by Francés Xavier Boya Alòs from Les and gained 46.13% of the votes at the General Council elections in 2007.

Electoral performance

General Council of Aran

References

External links
 

Political parties in Val d'Aran
Social democratic parties